Scott Lautenbaugh (born November 11, 1964 in Sioux City, Iowa) is an American politician from the state of Nebraska. He served in the Nebraska Legislature from 2007 to 2014, representing an Omaha-based district.

Personal life
He was born on November 11, 1964, in Sioux City, Iowa, and graduated from South High School in Omaha in 1983. He earned a B.A. (1987) and a J.D. (1991) from Creighton University. He is divorced and has two children. He is a lobbyist and an attorney in private practice in Omaha.

From 2000 to 2003, Lautenbaugh served as the Douglas County Election Commissioner. During his time in that position, he redistricted the Omaha City Council, and his redistricting was upheld by the Nebrasksa Supreme Court after years of litigation.  Further, he also enacted a school board redistricting plan for the Omaha Public Schools that was only partially modified by the Nebraska Supreme Court.

In February 2013, he was arrested for a DUI near 147th and Maple Streets in Omaha. His blood-alcohol level was .234, which is nearly three times the legal limit in Nebraska. In June 2013 he was sentenced to 2 days in jail, a year probation, and a $500 fine.

State legislature
Lautenbaugh was appointed in 2007 by Governor Dave Heineman to replace Mick Mines, who resigned his seat as the senator from the 18th Nebraska legislative district. The district at the time included parts of Douglas and Washington counties, including the cities of Blair and Fort Calhoun, as well small portion of Omaha north of Maple Road between 108th and 168th Streets, and stretching south to Dodge Road between 156th and 168th Streets. He was Chairman of the Rules Committee for the Nebraska Legislature; and sat on the Government, Judiciary, Urban Affairs, General Affairs and Transportation and Telecommunications committees.

In the November 2008 General Election, Lautenbaugh defeated Carl Lorenzen, and served the remaining two years of Senator Mines' term. Lautenbaugh was reelected in 2010 to an additional four-year term as state senator.

Lautenbaugh resigned from the Legislature two months before the end of his term, in November 2014, in order to become a lobbyist.

References

1964 births
Living people
Nebraska state senators
Politicians from Sioux City, Iowa
Politicians from Omaha, Nebraska
Creighton University alumni
Nebraska politicians convicted of crimes